Zafer Square is a square in Ankara, Turkey. Zafer means "victory". Although it is traditionally called square it is no longer a junction point.

It is between Kızılay Square and Sıhhiye Square. An underground bazaar of bookstores is to the east and an officers' club is to the west of the square. At the center of the Atatürk Boulevard there is a statue of Mustafa Kemal Atatürk (1881–1938), the founder of the Turkish Republic in marshal uniform. The monument was commissioned to Pietro Canonica, an Italian sculptor, who had also created several other monuments in Turkey. It was erected on 4 November 1927. The building material is bronze with a marble base.

References

Squares in Ankara
Buildings and structures completed in 1927
Buildings and structures in Ankara
Statues of Mustafa Kemal Atatürk
Bronze sculptures in Turkey
Çankaya, Ankara